The Cemetery of Poggioreale is one of the major cemeteries in Naples, Italy. It is also known as Camposanto Nuovo, to distinguish it from Camposanto Vecchio, which is now known as Cemetery of the 366 Fossae. It is bordered by the Largo Santa Maria del Pianto, Via del Riposo, Via Santa Maria del Pianto, and via nuova Poggioreale, and is built upon the ruins of Alphonso II's Villa Poggio Reale.

History
Until the 18th century most funeral monuments were located inside churches, closer to the divine air, and where they could either buy a generation of prayer, or at least be entombed within earshot of genuflecting masses, so as to be lifted into heaven by their overhead chants. As churches became crowded with tombs, this open air monumental cemetery allowed noble families to build private chapels and crypts in a slightly more secular location, on the southern side of the hill of Poggioreale. The cemetery was begun during the Napoleonic occupation, and remodelled in 1836–1837.

The layout is that of a garden. At the upper end is a Neoclassic church with a Pieta by Gennaro Cali, in its tribune; and behind a large oblong square, surrounded by a portico of fluted Doric columns, out of which open 102 proprietary chapels, beneath each of which are the family vaults of the owners. The colossal, nondenominational figure of Religion in the centre of the quadrangle is by Tito Angelini. Most of the vaults are occupied by subscription to confraternities, or burial clubs.

Those who cannot afford to pay for their own graves are interred without coffins in another part of the grounds, as in the "Cemetery of the 366 Fossae"; but as the fee is small, not more than half-a-dozen bodies are deposited during the three days each pit remains open. At the southwest extremity is a space set aside for notable Neapolitans: a Quadrato degli uomini illustri (Quadrangle for illustrious men). Also adjacent are 19th-century Protestant and Jewish cemeteries of Naples.

Notable interments
Among those buried here are:
 Benedetto Croce, philosopher and politician (tomb in the immediate vicinity of the entrance)
 Salvatore Di Giacomo, poet and writer
 Raffaele Viviani, playwright
 Benedetto Cairoli politician
 E. A. Mario, author
 Luigi Settembrini writer and politician
 Francesco De Sanctis, writer and politician
 Vincenzo Gemito, sculptor
 Giovanni Amendola, politician
 Nicola Antonio Zingarelli, musician
 Saverio Mercadante, musician
 Luigi Giura, engineer of Bridge Real Ferdinando sul Garigliano
 Sigismund Thalberg, musician
 Tito Angelini, sculptor
 Luca Botta, operatic tenor
 Stefano Gasse, architect
 Antonio Niccolini, Tuscan architect who completed the facade of the  Teatro San Carlo.
 Ferdinando Russo, poet and writer
 Libero Bovio, poet
 Ernesto Capocci, astronomer and politician
 Annibale de Gasparis, astronomer and politician

References

Bibliography

External links
 

Cemeteries in Naples
Burial monuments and structures
1836 establishments in Italy